A secret service is a government agency, intelligence agency, or the activities of a government agency, concerned with the gathering of intelligence data. The tasks and powers of a secret service can vary greatly from one country to another. For instance, a country may establish a secret service which has some policing powers (such as surveillance) but not others. The powers and duties of a government organization may be partly secret and partly not. The organization may be said to operate openly at home and secretly abroad, or vice versa. Secret police and intelligence agencies can usually be considered secret services. 

Various states and regimes, at different times and places, established bodies that could be described as a secret service or secret police – for example, the agentes in rebus of the late Roman Empire were sometimes defined as such. In modern times, the French police officer Joseph Fouché is sometimes regarded as the primary pioneer within secret intelligence. Among other things, he is alleged to have prevented several murder attempts on Napoleon during his time as First Consul Bonaparte (1799–1804) through a large and tight net of various informers.

References

External links 

National security
Government agencies by type